The Roman Catholic Archdiocese of San Juan de Puerto Rico is an ecclesiastical territory or diocese of the Catholic Church in the United States, comprising the northeast portion of the island of Puerto Rico. Its jurisdiction includes the municipalities of Dorado, Toa Baja, Cataño, Toa Alta, Bayamón, Guaynabo, San Juan, Trujillo Alto, and Carolina.

History
On November 15, 1504, Pope Julius II issued the Papal Bull Illius fulciti which erected the first ecclesiastical province in the New World consisting of the Archdiocese of Hyaguata (located at Santo Domingo), the Diocese of Magua (located at Concepción de La Vega), and the Diocese of Bayuna (located at Lares de Guahaba). As all the dioceses were located on the island of Hispañiola, the Spanish Crown requested that the Diocese of Bayuna be transferred to Puerto Rico. The Bull never went into effect due to the objection of Ferdinand II of Aragon who opposed that the Bull gave the dioceses the right to receive a portion of the earnings from the gold and precious stones discovered in the territory. On August 8, 1511, Pope Julius II issued a new Papal Bull Pontifax Romanus which extinguished the previously granted ecclesiastical province and its dioceses and reassigned their delegated bishops: Pedro Suárez de Deza, Bishop Elect of Hyaguata, was reassigned to the Diocese of Concepción de la Vega; Father Alonso Manso, Bishop Elect of Magua, was reassigned to the Diocese of Puerto Rico; and Francisco Garcia de Padilla, Bishop Elect of Bayuna, was reassigned to the Diocese of Santo Domingo.

The See of San Juan de Puerto Rico was canonically erected on August 8, 1511, as the Diocese of Puerto Rico on the island of San Juan, as it was then called.  Due to the switch of names between the island and the capital its name was changed on November 21, 1924, to the Diocese of San Juan in Puerto Rico.  With the creation of the Diocese of Arecibo on April 30, 1960, San Juan was raised to the status of an archdiocese, with the new archbishop leading a metropolitan province comprising all the dioceses on the island as suffragan dioceses.

The Archdiocese of San Juan de Puerto Rico is the metropolitan see for the Caguas, Fajardo–Humacao, Ponce, Mayagüez and Arecibo.

The current archbishop is Roberto González Nieves, O.F.M.

On August 29, 2018, the diocese filed for Chapter 11 bankruptcy protection. On September 27, 2018, federal Judge Edward Godoy protected all assets of the archdiocese and its suffragan dioceses under Chapter 11, protecting them from seizures by individual creditors, for example, as payments to retired teachers.

Bishops
The lists of bishops, archbishops and auxiliary bishops and their terms of service:

Bishops of Puerto Rico
 Alonso Manso (1511–1539 Died)
 Rodrigo de Bastidas y Rodriguez de Romera (1541–1567 Resigned)
 Francisco Andrés de Carvajal, O.F.M. (1568–1570 Appointed, Archbishop of Santo Domingo)
 Manuel de Mercado Aldrete, O.S.H. (1570–1576 Appointed, Bishop of Panamá)
 Diego de Salamanca Polanco, O.S.A. (1576–1587 Resigned)
 Nicolás de Ramos y Santos, O.F.M. (1588–1592 Appointed, Archbishop of Santo Domingo)
 Antonio Calderón de León (1593–1598 Appointed, Bishop of Panamá)
 Martín Vasquez de Arce, O.P. (1599–1609 Died)
 Francisco Diaz de Cabrera y Córdoba, O.P. (1611–1614 Appointed, Bishop of Trujillo)
 Pedro de Solier y Vargas, O.S.A. (1614–1619 Appointed, Archbishop of Santo Domingo)
 Bernardo de Valbuena y Villanueva (1620–1627 Died)
 Juan López de Agurto de la Mata (1631–1634 Confirmed, Bishop of Coro)
 Juan Alonso de Solis y Mendoza, O. Carm. (1636–1641 Died)
 Damián Lopez de Haro y Villarda, O.SS.T. (1643–1648 Died)
 Hernando de Lobo Castrillo, O. Carm. (1649–1651 Died)
 Francisco Naranjo, O.P. (1652–1655 Died)
 Juan Francisco Arnaldo Isasi (1656–1661 Died)
 Benito de Rivas, O.S.B. (1663–1668 Died)
 Bartolomé Garcia de Escañuela, O.F.M. (1670–1676 Appointed, Bishop of Durango)
 Juan de Santiago y León Garabito (1676–1677 Confirmed, Bishop of Guadalajara)
 Marcos de Sobremonte (1677–1681 Died)
 Juan Francisco de Padilla y San Martín, O. de M. (1683–1699 Appointed, Bishop of Santa Cruz de la Sierra)
 Jerónimo Nosti de Valdés, O.S.Bas. (1704–1705 Appointed, Bishop of San Cristobal de la Habana)
 Pedro de la Concepcion y Urtiaga, O.F.M. (1707–1715 Died)
 Raimundo Caballero, O.S.B. (1716–1716 Died)
 Fernando de Valdivia y Mendoza, O.A.R. (1718–1725 Died)
 Sebastián Lorenzo Pizarro, O.S.Bas. (1727–1736 Died)
 Francisco Pérez Lozano, O.S.Bas. (1738–1743 Died)
 Francisco Placido de Béjar, O.S.Bas. (1743–1745 Died)
 Francisco Julián Antolino (1748–1752 Confirmed, Bishop of Caracas, Santiago de Venezuela)
 Pedro Martínez de Oneca (1756–1760 Died)
 Mariano Martí (1761–1770 Appointed, Bishop of Caracas, Santiago de Venezuela)
 Manuel Jiménez Pérez, O.S.B. (1771–1781 Died)
 Felipe José de Tres-Palacios y Verdeja (1784–1789 Appointed, Bishop of San Cristobal de la Habana)
 Francisco de Cuerda (1790–1795 Resigned)
 Juan Bautista de Zengotita y Bengoa, O. de M. (1795–1802 Died)
 Juan Alejo de Arizmendi de La Torre (1803–1814 Died)
 Mariano Rodríguez de Olmedo y Valle (1815–1825 Confirmed, Bishop of San Cristobal de la Habana)
 Pedro Gutiérrez de Cos y Saavedra Seminario (1826–1833 Died)
 Francisco Fleix y Soláns (1846–1846 Confirmed, Bishop of San Cristobal de la Habana)
 Francisco de La Puente, O.P. (1846–1848 Confirmed, Bishop of Segovia)
 Gil Estévez y Tomás (1848–1854 Confirmed, Bishop of Tarazona)
 Vicente Benigno Carrión, O.F.M. Cap. (1857–1871 Died)
 Juan Antonio Puig y Montserrat, O.F.M. (1874–1894 Died)
 Toribio Minguella y Arnedo, O.A.R. (1894–1898 Appointed, Bishop of Sigüenza)
 Francisco Javier Valdés y Noriega, O.S.A. (1898–1899 Resigned)
 James Herbert Blenk, S.M. (1899–1906 Appointed, Archbishop of New Orleans, Louisiana)
 William Ambrose Jones, O.S.A. (1907–1921 Died)
 George Joseph Caruana (1921–1925), Title Changed with Title of Diocese

Bishops of San Juan de Puerto Rico
 George Joseph Caruana (1924–1925), Appointed, Apostolic Delegate to México
 Edwin Vincent Byrne (8 Mar 1929 - 12 Jun 1943), Appointed Archbishop of Santa Fe
 James Peter Davis (1943–1960), Elevated to Archbishop

Archdiocese of San Juan de Puerto Rico
 James Peter Davis (1960–1964), Appointed Archbishop of Santa Fe
 Luis Aponte Martínez (1964–1999) (elevated to Cardinal in 1973)
 Roberto González Nieves, O.F.M. (1999–present)

Auxiliary bishops
 Juan de Dios López de Victoria (1963–1992); died in office
 Enrique Manuel Hernández Rivera (1979–1981); named Bishop of Caguas 
 Héctor Rivera Pérez (1979–2009); retired
 Hermín Negrón Santana (1981–2012); died in office
 Daniel Fernández Torres (2007–2010); named Bishop of Arecibo
 Alberto Arturo Figueroa Morales (2019–2022)

Other priests of this diocese who became bishops
 Rafael Grovas Felix, appointed Bishop of Caguas in 1965
 Antulio Parrilla Bonilla, S.J. (priest here, 1952–1957), appointed auxiliary bishop of Caguas in 1965

High schools
 Academia San José, Guaynabo
 Academia del Perpetuo Socorro, San Juan
 Academia Maria Reina, San Juan
 Academia San Jorge, San Juan
 Colegio Católico Notre Dame, Caguas
 Colegio María Auxiliadora, Carolina
 Colegio San Ignacio de Loyola, San Juan
 Colegio San José, San Juan

Ecclesiastical Province of San Juan

 Arecibo
 Caguas
 Fajardo-Humacao
 Mayagüez
 Ponce

Bankruptcy
On January 11, 2018, Catholic Schools of the Archdiocese of San Juan filed for Chapter 11 bankruptcy, stating that the current pension plan was unworkable and applied for a new plan which has an estimated $10 million in assets and $10 million in liabilities.  On March 27, 2018, local Judge Anthony Cuevas issued an embargo against the Archdiocese of San Juan which would remain in effect until they could find $4.7 million to pay for teachers pension.  It was also ruled that the Catholic Church in Puerto Rico was a single entity and that the embargo would also apply to all the suffragan dioceses of the Archdiocese of San Juan. On August 29, 2018, the Archdiocese of San Juan filed for Chapter 11 bankruptcy, noting that they were unable find the $4.7 million. On September 7, 2018, US Bankruptcy Judge Edward Godoy protected the Archdiocese of San Juan under Chapter 11, avoiding seizure of assets and payment of pensions to their retired teachers. However, the bankruptcy will also apply to other Dioceses in Puerto Rico as well.

See also

 Catholic Church by country
 Catholic Church in the United States
 Ecclesiastical Province of San Juan de Puerto Rico
 Global organisation of the Catholic Church
 Historical list of the Catholic bishops of Puerto Rico
 List of Roman Catholic archdioceses (by country and continent)
 List of Roman Catholic dioceses (alphabetical) (including archdioceses)
 List of Roman Catholic dioceses (structured view) (including archdioceses)
 List of the Catholic dioceses of the United States
 Timeline of San Juan, Puerto Rico

References

External links
 Arquidiócesis de San Juan de Puerto Rico (Official Site in Spanish)
 Official Facebook site (in Spanish)
 Roman Catholic Metropolitan Archdiocese of San Juan de Puerto Rico GCatholic.org website
 Catholic Hierarchy Profile of the Archdiocese of San Juan de Puerto Rico
 Teleoro Canal 13 - Archdiocese of San Juan de Puerto Rico TV Channel (Official Site in Spanish)
 Radio Oro 92.5 FM - Archdiocese of San Juan de Puerto Rico FM Radio Station (Official Site in Spanish)
 Radio Paz 810 AM - Archdiocese of San Juan de Puerto Rico AM Radio Station (Official Site in Spanish)(Former  Radio Station)
 Periódico El Visitante de Puerto Rico (The Visitor of Puerto Rico) Official Weekly of the Puerto Rican Episcopal Conference (Official Site in Spanish)

Roman Catholic dioceses in the United States
Roman Catholic dioceses in Puerto Rico
Religious organizations established in the 1510s
1511 establishments in the Spanish Empire
Roman Catholic dioceses established in the 16th century
 
Companies that filed for Chapter 11 bankruptcy in 2018
16th-century establishments in Puerto Rico